In Breton folklore, Iannic-ann-ôd or Yannig an Aod (meaning "Little John of the shore"), are said to be the lost souls of those drowned at sea and were never recovered.  They are said to be heard along coastlines at night crying, "Iou! Iou!".

From The Celtic Legend of the Beyond:

See also 
 La Llorona
 Melusine

References
 The Celtic Legend of the Beyond, by Anatole Le Braz, 

European ghosts
Breton legendary creatures